Milan Nemec (born 14 January 1959) is a former Slovak football player and most recently a manager of Železiarne Podbrezová U19 team. He played for Czechoslovakia, for which he played 2 times.

Nemec is remembered for scoring two goals against Borussia Mönchengladbach in a 1984–85 UEFA Cup first round, first leg fixture, played at Štiavničky, in a 2-3 defeat.

Personal life
His son Adam Nemec is also footballer. Adam Nemec is a former Slovakia national team striker, a leading national team goalscorer and he competed in numerous top leagues across Europe. Adam Nemec currently plays for Voluntari. Nemec also has a younger son named Andrej, who plays football in Austria.

Honours

Player
Dukla Banska Bystrica
Slovak Cup: 1981
Czechoslovak Second League - Top scorer: 1982–83 (22 goals)

Manager
Železiarne Podbrezová
3. Liga: 1997–98 (Promoted)

Pohronie
2. Liga: 2018–19 (Promoted)

References

Living people
1959 births
People from Žarnovica District
Sportspeople from the Banská Bystrica Region
Czechoslovak footballers
Czechoslovak expatriate footballers
Czechoslovakia international footballers
Slovak footballers
Slovak expatriate footballers
Slovak football managers
Association football forwards
ŠK Slovan Bratislava players
FC VSS Košice players
FK Žiar nad Hronom players
FK Dukla Banská Bystrica players
MFK Nová Baňa players
FK Železiarne Podbrezová players
FC Rot-Weiß Erfurt players
Czechoslovak First League players
Slovak National Football League players
3. Liga (Slovakia) players
4. Liga (Slovakia) players
DDR-Oberliga players
MFK Nová Baňa managers
FK Železiarne Podbrezová managers
MŠK Žilina managers
FK Pohronie managers
FK Sitno Banská Štiavnica managers
Slovak Super Liga managers
2. Liga (Slovakia) managers
3. Liga (Slovakia) managers
4. Liga (Slovakia) managers
Expatriate footballers in East Germany
Czechoslovak expatriate sportspeople in East Germany
Expatriate footballers in Belgium
Czechoslovak expatriate sportspeople in Belgium
Expatriate footballers in Austria
Expatriate football managers in Austria
Slovak expatriate sportspeople in Austria